The Fiat 242 was a van which was produced by Fiat from 1974.

Overview 

The Fiat 242 van was the result of a cooperation with Citroën and was sold under the name Citroën C35 in France. Both vehicles were produced in Italy till 1987 with Fiat engines, and then in France by Chausson, when Fiat discontinued the 242. Citroën retained the model until 1992. This cooperation was the precursor of Sevel.

Citroën C35 
The Citroën C35 shares the same platform as the Fiat 242. The first diesel engine available that had been used in the Citroën C35 since 1973, the *2.2 L (2200 cc) diesel inline-four engine was shared with the Citroën CX 2200 D.

References

External links 
 Citroën World: C15, C25 & C35 links

242
Vans
Vehicles introduced in 1974
Front-wheel-drive vehicles